Johnny Nellore (born 19 August 1951) is an Indian politician who is the Deputy chairman  of Kerala Congress  and ex-Chairman of the KC (Jacob). He is an advocate in Muvattupuzha Bar Association.

He was elected to Kerala Legislative Assembly in 1991, 1996 and 2001.

Career
Entered politics while a student; was the General Secretary of K.S.C.; General Secretary K.Y.F.; Ernakulam District Secretary of Kerala Congress; Chairman, B.D.C., Muvattupuzha; Secretary of Muvattupuzha Bar Association, President of several organisations; office bearer of many Trade Unions; General Secretary, Kerala Congress (Jacob).

Johnny Nellore was first elected to the Kerala Legislative Assembly as an MLA from Muvattupuzha constituency in 1991, and remained as a member for a period of over fifteen years, representing Muvattupuzha constituency. He was elected thrice from Muvattupuzha and lost two subsequent elections. 

He was elected from Muvattupuzha in 1991, 1996, 2001 respectively. He is the only person elected from Muvattupuzha thrice in a continuous term. In 1991 he defeated A.V Issac of CPI by a margin of 3779 votes, in 1996 he defeated P. M. Thomas by a margin of 9696 votes and in 2001 against George Kunnappily by a margin of 8893 votes. In 2011 he contested from Angamaly but lost to Jose Thettayil, a former minister of Kerala.

Personal life
Johnny Nellore is married to Chinnu (Chinnamma) who is a housewife. The couple has a daughter Soumya and a son Sony Nelloor.

References

Members of the Kerala Legislative Assembly
Malayali politicians
1951 births
Living people
People from Muvattupuzha
Kerala Congress (Jacob) politicians